Heptaloba is a genus of moths in the family Pterophoridae.

Species
Heptaloba argyriodactylus
Heptaloba tanglong

External links
The Entomologist's Monthly Magazine

Deuterocopinae
Taxa named by Thomas de Grey, 6th Baron Walsingham
Moth genera